Avag-Sargis Mkhargrdzeli (died 1268 AD) was a 13th century Georgian noble of Armenian descent bearing titles of mandaturtukhutsesi and amirspasalar of Georgia. He is known for signing famous "Rkoni Charter".

Sources
Shoshiashvili, N., Georgian Soviet Encyclopedia, vol. 7, p. 271. Tbilisi, 1984
Ivane Javakhishvili, History of Georgian nation, Volume II-III, Tbilisi, 1965-1966
Джанашиа С. Н., Об одном примере искажения исторической правды ... , Тб., 1947;

Nobility of Georgia (country)
13th-century people from Georgia (country)
House of Mkhargrdzeli
1268 deaths